The Vienna BioCenter is a cluster of life science research institutes and biotechnology companies located in the 3rd municipal District of Vienna, Austria. It grew around the Research Institute of Molecular Pathology (IMP), which opened in 1988. The entities at the Vienna BioCenter employ more than 2,000 people, including 600 students.

Structure 
As of 2020, the Vienna BioCenter is an association of 4 research institutes, 38 biotech companies, 1 outreach organisation, 4 service companies and 2 business incubators.

The four basic research institutes are the Research Institute of Molecular Pathology (IMP), the Max Perutz Labs of the University of Vienna and Medical University of Vienna, the Institute of Molecular Biotechnology (IMBA) of the Austrian Academy of Sciences (ÖAW), and the Gregor Mendel Institute of Molecular Plant Biology (GMI), also of the ÖAW. These institutes maintain a joint international PhD programme.

The "Vienna BioCenter Core Facilities" (VBCF) offer central services, largely scientific, but also including a child care centre.

Awards 
Kim Nasmyth, emeritus director of the Institute of Molecular Pathology, currently at the University of Oxford, received the 2018 Breakthrough Prize in Life Sciences for his work on chromosome segregation.

After receiving the 2015 Breakthrough Prize in Life Sciences, the 2020 the Nobel Prize for Chemistry was awarded to Emmanuelle Charpentier and Jennifer Doudna for their groundbreaking discoveries on the CRISPR/Cas9 system. Emmanuelle Charpentier was a principal investigator at the Max Perutz Labs at the University of Vienna from 2002 to 2009, where she laid the groundwork for developing the technology.

As of May 2021, scientists of the Vienna BioCenter institutes have been awarded 57 ERC grants and eleven Wittgenstein Awards.

References

External links

Research institutes in Austria
Biological research institutes